South Kent School, a private all-boys boarding school in South Kent, Connecticut, United States, is located on a  campus in western Litchfield County. It is sited on Spooner Hill east of Bull's Bridge, overlooking the former Housatonic Valley rail-line, Hatch Pond, and the 'whistle-stop' South Kent station, and is itself overlooked by Bull Mountain.

South Kent has been rated "A" due to its curriculum, diversity, sporting achievements, and college placement record.  In 2021, TheBestSchools.org ranked South Kent as #46 among all U.S. Boarding Schools

The school has an operating budget of approximately $14 million and a staff of less than 100.  From its inception, South Kent School was intended to offer a service-oriented education "at minimum cost for boys of ability and character, who presumably on graduation must be self-supporting. " Its motto is "Simplicity of life, Self-reliance, and Directness of purpose".

History
The hamlet of South Kent emerged in the mid-1700s on the "main road over Spooner Hill to Bull’s Bridge", where Jacob Bull established  an iron foundry; by 1800, an ironworks and forge were also set up near the outlet from Hatch Pond.   When the railroad came up the valley in the 1840s, more efficient competition from western foundries would shutter the Connecticut iron industry. By 1920, the township of Kent's population was half its Revolution-era level, and farm properties were to be had inexpensively.

The school was founded in 1923 as a joint venture between Reverend Frederick Herbert Sill, headmaster of Kent School, and two of his recent graduates, Samuel Slater Bartlett and Richard M. Cuyler. The Straight farm was purchased from members of the Judd family, and additions to the farmhouse were made to house a chapel, twenty-four students, and faculty.  From the start, students provided labor for daily cleaning and maintenance, as well as for unskilled construction. Over the years a number of buildings were added on the Straight property, and additional acreage acquired. Most recently, the defunct farm on the north end of Hatch Pond was purchased.

Sam Bartlett became the first headmaster, serving for 45 years. Bartlett was followed as headmaster by conservationist L. Wynne Wister (1955–69), then George M. Bartlett (son of the first headmaster) through 1989.  Peter Arango had a brief tenure, then Noble Richards '49 was headmaster until 1996. He was succeeded by John S. Farber (96-00), John C. Farr '58 (retired in 2003), then by Andrew J. Vadnais through 2018. South Kent School's present head of school is Lawrence A. Smith '73.  The school is governed by an independent board of trustees.

Students &Faculty
Enrollment at the beginning of the 2022–23 school year was 150 young men from around the world in four "forms" (or grades). Foreign students from twenty nations and U.S. students from nineteen states across America are represented.

There are 38 members of the instructional faculty, with 34 living on-campus.  Many are domiciled in facilities which are shared with student dorms.

Academics
South Kent is a college-preparatory school; the course of study is designed with the intent that every student will continue his education at a higher-level institution.

In 2017–18 the school has 35 faculty who offer 48 courses in 2 primary divisions, Math/Science and Humanities. The school year is divided into three terms: fall, winter, and spring.  Students normally enroll in five major academic courses each term.  Accelerated courses, including advanced placement, are offered in more than a dozen subjects (several in conjunction with Syracuse University).

To graduate, a student must earn a minimum of 18 credits, which include:
4 years of English;
3 years of mathematics
2 years of a foreign language;
2 years of science, one of which has laboratory;
2 years of history, one of which is United States History;
1 year of an art, and;
4 electives.

Cum Laude Society
The South Kent chapter of the Cum Laude Society annually considers the academic achievements of sixth-form students for election to membership.

English as a second language
ESL is a program for international students to improve and/or reinforce skills in written and oral English. The focus is on structure, comprehension and conversation.  In recent years nearly half of South Kent graduates have been non-native English speakers.

Center for Innovation
Due in part to its rural setting, the school has established a learning track focused on environmental management and entrepreneurship. Technologies range from historic architecture and building techniques to robotics and software design.
.  Students routinely interact with farm animals, engage in sustainable practice, and perform stewardship projects.

Student life
Students live in eight dormitories supervised by upper-formers; each dorm building has a resident faculty member or family.  All meals are eaten in the school dining hall: a breakfast buffet, family-style lunch shared with faculty where seating is assigned to ensure all students and faculty have an opportunity to engage, weekly formal dinners.  An on-campus health center (staffed by a live-in nurse, a physician and a counselor) provides 24-hour medical and infirmary services; on-line medical records enable access to every student's family.

Student leadership is developed with form councils, dorm supervisors, team captaincies, and prefects.

St. Michaels' Chapel holds daily Episcopal services.  Students of all faiths are expected to attend the all-school services several times a week, but are not expected to disengage from their own faith; arrangements are made to provide access to other services.

Athletics
In common with many boys' boarding schools, every student must participate in a "fitness-oriented athletic offering" at least two seasons of the year.  Sports include baseball, basketball, crew (rowing), golf, ice hockey, lacrosse, running (cross-country), soccer, and tennis.  Football was not offered after the 2009–2010 school year.  Competition is available at a variety of levels (intramural and interscholastic), so students can be serious about their activities.  At the same time, a number of boys attend the school each year preparing for a life as a professional athlete.

Facilities available to students include The Admiral James & Sybil Stockdale Arena, the Joseph J. Brown gymnasium, the Alumni Boathouse on Hatch Pond for rowing, the Anne H. Funnell cross-country trail, the hard court tennis courts, a weight-training facility, numerous athletics fields, and the adjacent Tom Fazio-designed Bulls Bridge Golf Club.

A strong intramural tradition (beginning in 1940) assigns each student to a Cardinal or Black club; athletic, academic, and games events throughout the year  accrue points for the annual award of a Cardinal/Black Cup.  Students are also encouraged to participate in non-organized athletic activity: skiing, hiking, swimming.

Notable alumni

 Jim Bellows (SKS 1940), Editor of the New York Herald-Tribune; major figure in the New Journalism.
 John Berryman (SKS 1932), Poet, (1965 Pulitzer for "77 Dream Songs", 1969 Bollingen & National Book Award for "His Toy, His Dream, His Rest")
 Gordon Clapp (SKS 1967), Emmy-Award-winning actor and Tony Award nominee, best known for his role as Detective Medavoy on NYPD Blue
 Durand Echeverria (SKS 1931), historian, Fulbright and Guggenheim fellow, National Humanities Foundation awardee.
 William S Farish III  (SKS 1958), US Ambassador to UK 2001-2004
 Charles Coulston Gillispie (SKS 1935), Dayton-Stockton Professor of History Emeritus at Princeton University, seminal science historian
 Donald Purple Hart  (SKS 1955),  former bishop of the Episcopal Diocese of Hawaii 
 Sukehiro Hasegawa  (SKS 1962), U.N Administrator, led peacekeeping operations in Somalia, Rwanda, and East Timor
 Florence Maybrick, convicted murderess buried in the school cemetery.
 Keith "Bang Bang" McCurdy (SKS (DNG 2004, Honorary diploma 2015), celebrity tattoo artist
 E. H. Beresford 'Chip' Monck (SKS 1958), Tony-winning lighting designer and stage manager, announcer for the 1969 Woodstock Festival
 Robert B. Oakley (SKS 1948), former US Ambassador to Pakistan, Somalia, and Zaire
 Neal Peirce (SKS 1950), Political columnist & editor: Congressional Quarterly, National Journal, The Washington Post Writers Group
 Charles Reid  (SKS 1955), watercolorist 
 Jonathan Richards (SKS 1958), novelist, actor, film critic, & political cartoonist 
 Rt. Rev Samuel Rodman  (SKS 1977), bishop of the Episcopal Diocese of North Carolina
 Martin Russ (SKS 1949), writer documenting the experience of U.S. combatants in the Korean War.
 Rathvon M. Tompkins (SKS 1931), Major General, USMC; commanded 3rd Marine Division in Vietnam 1967-71.

Father Sill wrote in his proposal for the founding of Kent School that it would be "to provide...for boys of ability and character, who presumably on graduation must be self-supporting...Simplicity, self-reliance and directness...."  Seventeen years later, he and his partners in the South Kent venture adopted that as the new school's guiding principles. In the early 2000s, Headmaster Vadnais and the Board recognized that young athletes with professional aspirations not only fit Father Sill's description,. many of them were likely to see high school as the final step in their education.  The number of notable athletes who have graduated from South Kent has burgeoned during the past quarter-century. They include:

 Andray Blatche (SKS 2005), Former NBA basketball player
 Tahj Bell (SKS 2010), Professional soccer player (Bermuda).
 Gilbert Brown (SKS 2006), basketball player for Ironi Nahariya of the Israeli Basketball Premier League
 Jean-Pierre Brunet (SKS 1948), two time U.S. Figure Skating Championships pairs champion (1945 and 1946).
 Matthew Bryan-Amaning (SKS 2007), Professional basketball player  (Great Britain)
 Jackie Carmichael (SKS 2009), Professional basketball player
 Choi Jin-soo (SKS 2008), Professional soccer player
 Paul Cummins (SKS 2003), Professional basketball player (Ireland).
 Nemanja Đurišić (SKS 2011), Professional basketball player (Poland).
 Joel Farabee (SA.SKS 2018), Professional hockey player with the NHL Philadelphia Flyers.
 Mike Garzi (SKS 2009), MLS soccer player (retired).
 Shayne Gostisbehere, (SKS 2011), Philadelphia Flyers, NHL
 Maurice Harkless, (SKS 2011), NBA player
 Abdoulaye Harouna (SKS 2014), Nigerian basketball player
 David Hicks (SKS 2007), basketball player for Ironi Nahariya of the Israeli Basketball Premier League
 Elijah Hughes (SKS 2016), NBA basketball player for Portland Trail Blazers.
 Ricky Ledo (SKS 2012), Former NBA basketball player
 Jack McClinton (SKS 2004), Former NBA basketball player
 Wade Megan (SKS 2009),  Former professional hockey player with the NHL St. Louis Blues.
 Jermaine 'Stretch' Middleton (SKS 2004), Harlem Globetrotters
 Tre Ming (SKS 2012), Professional soccer player Bermuda).
 Brian Mueller (SKS 1991), Professional hockey coach and player, 2-time college All American 
 Narito Namizato (SKS 2009), Professional basketball player  (Japan).
 Fabio Pereira (SKS 2010), MLS soccer player (retired).
 Mathias Emilio Pettersen  (SA.SKS 2018), Professional hockey player with the NHL Calgary Flames.
 Myles Powell (SKS 2016), basketball player for the Seton Hall Pirates men's basketball team. 2020 Big East Player of the Year. 2019-2020 Consensus First Team All-American.
 Pete Raymond (SKS 1964), US Olympic rower 1968 and (silver-medal) 1972
 Russell Smith (SKS 2010), currently plays in the Israeli Basketball Premier League, former Memphis Grizzlies, NBA; Louisville Cardinals Men's Basketball (2013 Big East All Conference)  2013 NCAA Men's Division I Championship)
 Daichi Taniguchi (SKS 2010), Professional basketball player (Japan).
 Isaiah Thomas (SKS 2008), NBA (2016 & 2017 All-Star, 2017 All NBA)
 Dorell Wright (SKS 2004), NBA player, broadcaster

Several notable athletes attended South Kent but graduated elsewhere; among them Nik Stauskas, Dion Waiters, and Tremont Waters
.

Accreditation and association memberships
South Kent School is accredited by the New England Association of Schools and Colleges and has held membership in District III of the Cum Laude Society for more than eighty years.

South Kent competes athletically as a member of the New England Preparatory School Athletic Council and the Hudson Valley Athletic League, and adheres to all league guidelines.  Students have the opportunity to participate in post-season tournaments and compete for league and New England titles.

The school also maintains membership in  the National Association of Independent Schools, the National Association of Episcopal Schools, the Secondary School Admission Test Board, the Connecticut Association of Independent Schools, The Association of Boarding Schools, the International Coalition of Boys Schools and the National Association for College Admission Counseling.

Publications
The Pigtail: a student publication issued three-five times per year.  The name of the paper is a reference to the nickname of the hamlet of South Kent as "Pigtail Corners" or simply "Pigtail".  A slogan at the school for many years was "Pigtail Against the World".
The Hillside: the South Kent School alumni magazine published twice annually.
Cardinal News Network: a student produced online publication which is updated on a continual basis.  Cardinal News Network features the videos and stories created by students in the Digital Communications classes.

References

External links
 

Boys' schools in the United States
Boarding schools in Connecticut
Episcopal schools in the United States
Kent, Connecticut
Private high schools in Connecticut
Schools in Litchfield County, Connecticut
1923 establishments in Connecticut
Educational institutions established in 1923